Michie Gleason is a film director and screenplay writer who has written and directed three films – The Island of the Mapmaker's Wife (2001), Summer Heat (1987) and Broken English (1981). She was assistant to the director on the film Days of Heaven (1978).

External links

http://virginiafilms.net/

Living people
American women film directors
American women screenwriters
21st-century American women
Year of birth missing (living people)